Boss's Day (also written Bosses Day or Boss' Day) is generally observed on or around October 16th in the United States. It has been pitched as a day for employees to thank their bosses for being kind and fair throughout the year, but some have opposed the concept as nothing more than a meaningless Hallmark Holiday, as well as placing unfair pressure on employees to kowtow to managers who earn more than they do while exercising power over them.

History 
Patricia Bays Haroski registered "National Boss' Day" with the U.S. Chamber of Commerce in 1958. She was working as a secretary for State Farm Insurance Company in Deerfield, Illinois for her father, at the time and chose October 16, which was her father's birthday.

The purpose of designating a special day in the workplace is to show the appreciation for her bosses she thought they deserved. This was also a strategy to attempt to improve intra-office relationships between managers and their employees. Haroski believed that young employees sometimes did not understand the hard work and dedication that their supervisors put into their work and the challenges they faced. Four years later, in 1962, Illinois Governor Otto Kerner backed Haroski's registration and officially proclaimed the day.

Hallmark Cards did not offer a Boss' Day card for sale until 1979.  It increased the size of its National Boss' Day line by 28 percent in 2007.

Criticism
Alison Green in U.S. News criticized it, saying "Traditional etiquette says quite clearly that any gift-giving in the workplace should be from a boss to an employee and not the other way around. The idea is that people shouldn't feel obligated to purchase gifts for someone who has power over their livelihood, and managers shouldn't benefit from the power dynamic in that way."

The Society for Human Resource Management suggests having HR handle appreciation for supervisors may be more appropriate in large companies.

References

Sources
 Sasoon, R (2009).  Going Through the Miles to Become a Boss.  NY, New York.  Crossroads Press.

October observances
International observances
1958 establishments in Illinois